Steven "Steve" Gebauer (born November 20, 1981) is an American curler.

At the national level, he is a 2014 United States mixed doubles curling champion.

Teams and events

Men's

Mixed doubles

Personal life
He started curling in 1996 at the age of 15.

References

External links

 Video: 

1981 births
Living people
People from Mendota Heights, Minnesota
Sportspeople from Minnesota
American male curlers
American curling champions